SM UB-89 was a German Type UB III submarine or U-boat in the German Imperial Navy during World War I. She was commissioned into the German Imperial Navy on 25 February 1918 as SM UB-89.

UB-89 was lost in a collision with the light cruiser  in Kiel. Seven crew members perished in the accident. On 30 October 1918 the boat was raised by the salvage ship . On 7 March 1919, en route to surrender, UB-89 began to drift and was towed to Ymuiden. In 1920, the boat was broken up in Dortrecht

Construction

He was built by AG Vulcan of Hamburg and following just under a year of construction, launched at Hamburg on 22 December 1917. UB-89 was commissioned early the next year under the command of Kptlt. Walter Gude. Like all Type UB III submarines, UB-89 carried 10 torpedoes and was armed with a  deck gun. UB-89 had a displacement of  while surfaced and  when submerged. Her engines enabled her to travel at  when surfaced and  when submerged.

Service history

Summary of raiding history

References

Notes

Citations

Bibliography 

 

German Type UB III submarines
World War I submarines of Germany
U-boats commissioned in 1918
1917 ships
Ships built in Hamburg
U-boats sunk in collisions
U-boats sunk in 1918
Maritime incidents in 1918
Shipwrecks in the North Sea